The Roman Catholic Diocese of Malaybalay (Lat: Dioecesis Malaibalaiensis) is a diocese of the Latin Church of the Roman Catholic Church in the Philippines.

Diocesan history
The diocese was erected on April 25, 1969, as the Territorial Prelature of Malaybalay. On November 15, 1982, the prelature was elevated to a full diocese.

The diocese is a suffragan of the Archdiocese of Cagayan de Oro. On June 29, 2021, Pope Francis named Fr. Noel Pedregosa, then-Apostolic Administrator as the fifth bishop of Malaybalay replacing Jose Cabantan who was appointed Archbishop of Cagayan de Oro.

Area of coverage
The Diocese covers the province of Bukidnon, except the municipality of Malitbog (which is under the Archdiocese of Cagayan de Oro), the municipality of Wao, Lanao del Sur, and Barangay Buda in Davao City (on the Bukidnon – Davao del Sur boundary). It covers an area of 8,294 square kilometers with a population of 1,726,520 (81.6% of which are Roman Catholics).

Ordinaries

Diocesan bishops

Affiliated bishops
Jose R. Manguiran (December 27, 1966 – May 27, 1987, appointed Bishop of Dipolog)
Noel P. Pedregosa (September 12, 1991 – June 29, 2021, appointed Bishop of Malaybalay)
Elenito Galido (April 25, 1979 – March 25, 2006, appointed Bishop of Iligan)

See also
Catholic Church in the Philippines

References

Malaybalay
Malaybalay
Christian organizations established in 1969
Malaybalay
Religion in Bukidnon
Roman Catholic dioceses and prelatures established in the 20th century